Theodore William Lange III (born January 5, 1948) is an American actor, director and screenwriter best known for his roles as bartender Isaac Washington in the TV series The Love Boat (1977-1986), and Junior in That's My Mama (1974-1975).

Early life 
Lange was born in Oakland, California, in 1948, the son of Geraldine and Theodore William Jr., both working in theatre and television. Lange graduated from Oakland Technical High where he was class and student body president. He completed an associate of arts degree at Merritt Junior College in Oakland before majoring in Drama at San Francisco City College. At City College, Lange was particularly active on the theatre scene and named Best Actor by the Black Students Association as well as winning a scholarship to the University of Colorado Shakespearean Festival in the summer of 1968.

Career beginnings 
After college, Lange started in theatre appearing in local Oakland productions and as guest artist in residence at the University of Santa Clara.  Later, he joined the New Shakespearan Company, acting in plays at the University of California, Berkeley.

Lange made his Broadway debut in the musical Hair and was featured in the first national touring of that show. He also performed in a one-man show, Behind the Mask: An Evening with Paul Laurence Dunbar.

Lange's first screen appearance was in the documentary film Wattstax in 1973. After appearing in the film Black Belt Jones in 1974, he portrayed Junior on the series That's My Mama before landing the role of the ship's bartender, Isaac, on The Love Boat in 1977, opposite  Gavin MacLeod.

In the early 1980s, following a letter of recommendation from Lynn Redgrave (whom he met on an episode of Love Boat), Lange attended a summer school at the Royal Academy of Dramatic Art to perfect his Shakespeare acting skills.

After he left the show in 1987, Lange appeared in various films and guest roles on 227, The Cleveland Show, Glitch!, Evening Shade, Scrubs, Drake & Josh, The King of Queens, Boy Meets World, Psych and Are We There Yet?

Directing and screenwriting
In 1977, he wrote the screenplay for the 1977 drama Passing Through, starring Cora Lee Day and Marla Gibbs. During the run of The Love Boat, Lange also served as director and screenwriter of several episodes of the series. In 1999, Lange directed two episodes of Love Boat: The Next Wave, the UPN series based on The Love Boat. He also directed episodes of Moesha, Dharma & Greg, and Eve. In 2008, he directed the drama For Love of Amy.

Lange has also done extensive theater work as playwright and stage director. He has penned 17 plays, including George Washington's Boy, a historical drama about the relationship between the first president and his favorite slave, along with the comedy Lemon Meringue Facade.

Lange remained close to Gavin MacLeod, his acting mentor, who was a Palm Springs resident, and saw his plays. He said in a 2014 interview with CBS New York.com of his long-running friendship with him, "Gavin lives in Palm Springs, I'm in LA. So, when I do my plays, he comes down and sees my plays or I'll go see what he's doing!"

Lange also said in a 2017 interview with The Wiseguyz Show, if his mentor enjoyed all the acting/dancing on The Love Boat series was: "Oh yeah, sure, Gavin was wonderful. Gavin lives down here in Palm Springs and we're still tight, all of us, Gavin and Bernie and Jill; we still see each other. Fred lives in a different state, we're still close, we're still good friends."

"Ask Isaac"
Before the American edition of FHM folded in 2006, Lange wrote a sex and advice column, titled "Ask Isaac", with adult film actress Jenna Jameson.

Celebrity Fit Club
In 2006, Lange appeared in the fourth season of the VH1 reality show Celebrity Fit Club. He lost 28 pounds during the show's run.

Personal life
Lange married Sheryl Thompson in 1978, and they divorced in 1989. The couple has two children, Theodore William IV and Turner Wallace Lange. Lange married Mary Ley in 2001. His mother, Geraldine Lange, was a personal secretary to a San Francisco mayor and was public affairs director of KBHK-TV in San Francisco in the early 1970s. She also hosted programs on KBHK-TV.

Awards
For his work theater directing, Lange received the NAACP's Renaissance Man Theatre Award, the Heroes and Legends HAL Lifetime Achievement Award, and the Dramalogue Award. Lange has also been the recipient of the James Cagney Directing Fellow Scholarship Award from the American Film Institute along with the Paul Robeson Award from Oakland's Ensemble Theatre.

Filmography

References

External links
 
 

1948 births
African-American male actors
African-American film directors
African-American television directors
Alumni of RADA
American male television actors
American male film actors
American male stage actors
American television directors
American male screenwriters
City College of San Francisco alumni
Living people
Male actors from Oakland, California
Film directors from California
Participants in American reality television series
Screenwriters from California
21st-century African-American people
20th-century African-American people